A shoe size is an indication of the fitting size of a shoe for a person.

There are a number of different shoe-size systems used worldwide. While all shoe sizes use a number to indicate the length of the shoe, they differ in exactly what they measure, what unit of measurement they use, and where the size 0 (or 1) is positioned. Some systems also indicate the shoe width, sometimes also as a number, but in many cases by one or more letters. Some regions use different shoe-size systems for different types of shoes (e.g. men's, women's, children's, sport, and safety shoes). This article sets out several complexities in the definition of shoe sizes. In practice, shoes are often tried on for both size and fit before they are purchased.

Deriving the shoe size

Foot versus shoe and last
The length of a person's foot is commonly defined as the distance between two parallel lines that are perpendicular to the foot and in contact with the most prominent toe and the most prominent part of the heel. Foot length is measured with the subject standing barefoot and the weight of the body equally distributed between both feet.

The sizes of the left and right feet are often slightly different. In this case, both feet are measured, and purchasers of mass-produced shoes are advised to purchase a shoe size based on the larger foot, as most retailers do not sell pairs of shoes in non-matching sizes.

Each size of shoe is considered suitable for a small interval of foot lengths, typically limited by half-point of the shoe size system.

A shoe-size system can refer to three characteristic lengths:
 The median length of feet for which a shoe is suitable. For customers, this measure has the advantage of being directly related to their body measures. It applies equally to any type, form, or material of shoe. However, this measure is less popular with manufacturers, because it requires them to test carefully for each new shoe model, for which range of foot sizes it is recommendable. It puts on the manufacturer the burden of ensuring that the shoe will fit a foot of a given length.
 The length of the inner cavity of the shoe. This measure has the advantage that it can be measured easily on the finished product. However, it will vary with manufacturing tolerances and only gives the customer very crude information about the range of foot sizes for which the shoe is suitable.
 The length of the "last", the foot-shaped template over which the shoe is manufactured. This measure is the easiest one for the manufacturer to use, because it identifies only the tool used to produce the shoe. It makes no promise about manufacturing tolerances or for what size of foot the shoe is actually suitable. It leaves all responsibility and risk of choosing the correct size with the customer. Further, the last can be measured in several different ways, resulting in different measurements. 

All these measures differ substantially from one another for the same shoe. For example, the inner cavity of a shoe must typically be 15 mm longer than the foot, and the shoe last would be 2 size points larger than the foot, but this varies between different types of shoes and the shoe size system used.

Length
Sizing systems also differ in the units of measurement they use. This also results in different increments between shoe sizes, because usually only "full" or "half" sizes are made.

The following length units are commonly used today to define shoe-size systems:

This unit is commonly used in Continental Europe, and Russia and former USSR countries.
This is the basis for current UK and North American shoe sizes, with the largest shoe size taken as twelve inches (a size 12) i.e. 30.5 cm, and then counting backwards in barleycorn units, so a size 11 is 11.67 inches or 29.6 cm.
 Metric measurements in millimetres (mm) or centimetres (cm), with intervals of 5 mm and 7.5 mm are used in the international Mondopoint system (USSR/Russia and East Asia).

Since the early 2000s, labels on sports shoes typically include sizes measured in all four systems: EU, UK, US and cm (Mondopoint).

Zero point
The sizing systems also place size 0 (or 1) at different locations:

 Size 0 as a foot's length of 0. The shoe size is directly proportional to the length of the foot in the chosen unit of measurement. Sizes of children's, men's, and women's shoes, as well as sizes of different types of shoes, can be compared directly. This is used with the Mondopoint system (USSR/Russia and East Asia).
 Size 0 as the length of the shoe's inner cavity of 0. The shoe size is then directly proportional to the inner length of the shoe. This is used with systems that also take the measurement from the shoe. While sizes of children's, men's and women's shoes can be compared directly, this is not necessarily true for different types of shoes that require a different amount of "wiggle room" in the toe box. This is used with the Continental European system.
 Size 0 (or 1) can just be simply a shoe of a given length. Typically, this will be the shortest length deemed practical; but this can be different for children's, teenagers', men's, and women's shoes - making it impossible to compare sizes. For example, a women's shoe at size 8 is a different length from a men's shoe at size 8 in the US system, but not the British.

Width
Some systems also include the width of a foot (or the girth of a shoe last), but do so in a variety of ways:
 Measured foot width in millimetres (mm) - this is done with the Mondopoint system. 
 Measured width as a letter (or combination of letters), which is taken from a table (indexed to length and width/girth) or just assigned on an ad-hoc basis. Examples are (each starting with the narrowest width):
 AAA, AA, A, B, C, D, E, EE, EEE is the typical North American system and follows the brannock device standards, per the system B is narrow, C is regular, D is medium, E is wide, EE is extra wide and so on. The unlettered D size is the norm for men and B for women.
 4A, 3A, 2A, A, B, C, D, E, 2E, 3E, 4E, 5E, 6E (variant North American).
 C, D, E, F, G, H (common UK; "medium" is usually F but varies by manufacturer—makers Edward Green and Crockett & Jones, among others, use E instead, but one maker's E is not necessarily the same size as another's).
 N (narrow), M (medium) or R (regular), W (wide).
 For children's sizes in North America, typical letters used are M or B (medium), W or D (wide), EW or 2E (extra wide). 

The width for which these sizes are suitable can vary significantly between manufacturers. The A–E width indicators used by most American, Canadian, and some British shoe manufacturers are typically based on the width of the foot, and common step sizes are  inch (4.8 mm).

Difficulties 
There could be differences between various shoe size tables from shoemakers and shoe stores. They are usually due to the following factors:

 Different methods of measuring the shoes, different manufacturing processes, or different allowances even when the same system is used.
 An indication in centimetres or inches can mean the length of the foot or the length of the shoe's inner cavity. 
 Differing amounts of wiggle room required for different sizes of shoes.
 For wide feet, a shoe several sizes larger (and actually too long) may be required and may also result in inconsistent size indications when different typical widths are attributed to specific shoe sizing systems.
 Some tables for children take future growth into account. The shoe size is then larger than what would correspond to the actual length of the foot.

Conversion tables available on the Web often contain obvious errors, not taking into account different zero points or wiggle room.   

Although shoe size systems are not fully standardised, the ISO/TC 137 had released a technical specification ISO/TS 19407:2015 for converting shoe sizes across various local sizing systems. Even though the problem of converting shoe sizes accurately has yet to be fully resolved, this standard serves as "a good compromise solution" for shoe-buyers.

Common sizing systems

United Kingdom 
Shoe size in the United Kingdom, Ireland, India, Pakistan and South Africa is based on the length of the last used to make the shoes, measured in barleycorns ( inch) starting from the smallest size deemed practical, which is called size zero. It is not formally standardised.

A child's size zero is equivalent to 4 inches (a hand = 12 barleycorns = 10.16 cm), and the sizes go up to size  (measuring  barleycorns, or ). Thus, the calculation for a children's shoe size in the UK is:
 
equivalent to:
 .

An adult size one is then the next size up (26 barleycorns, or ) and each size up continues the progression in barleycorns. The calculation for an adult shoe size in the UK is thus:
 
equivalent to:
 .
Although this sizing standard is nominally for both men and women, some manufacturers use different numbering for women's UK sizing.

In Australia and New Zealand, the UK system is followed for men and children's footwear.  Women's footwear follows the US sizings.

In Mexico, shoes are sized either according to the foot length they are intended to fit, in cm, or alternatively to another variation of the barleycorn system, with sizes calculated approximately as:
 
equivalent to:
 .

United States 
In the United States and Canada, the traditional system is similar to British but there are different zero points for children's, men's, and women's shoe sizes. The most common is the customary system where men's shoes are one size longer than the UK equivalent, making a men's 13 in the US the same size as a men's 12 in the UK.

Customary

 
equivalent to:
 .

In the "standard" or "FIA" (Footwear Industries of America) scale, women's sizes are men's sizes plus 1 (so a men's  is a women's ):
 
equivalent to:
 .

There is also the "common" scale, where women's sizes are equal to men's sizes plus .

Thus the formula for children's sizes in the US is 
 
equivalent to:
 .

Alternatively, a Mondopoint-based scale running from K4 to K13 and then 1 to 7 is in use. K4 to K9 are toddler sizes, K10 to K13 are pre-school and 1 to 7 are grade school sizes.

Brannock Device

The Brannock Device is a measuring instrument invented by Charles F. Brannock in 1925 and now found in many shoe stores.

The device also measures the length of the arch, or the distance between the heel and the ball (metatarsal head) of the foot. For this measurement, the device has a shorter scale at the instep of the foot with an indicator that slides into position. If this scale indicates a larger size, it is taken in place of the foot's length to ensure proper fitting.

For children's sizes, additional wiggle room is added to allow for growth.

The device also measures the width of the foot and assigns it designations of AAA, AA, A, B, C, D, E, EE, or EEE. The widths are  inches apart and differ by shoe length.

Some shoe stores and medical professionals use optical 3D surface scanners to precisely measure the length and width of both feet and recommend the appropriate shoe model and size.

Conversion between US and UK sizing

Continental Europe

 
equivalent to:
 .

The Continental European system is used in Austria, Belgium, Denmark, France, Germany, Italy, Luxembourg, the Netherlands, Norway, Poland, Portugal, Spain, Sweden, Switzerland, and most other continental European countries. It is also used in Middle Eastern countries (such as Iran), Brazil—which uses the same method but subtracts 2 from the final result, in effect measuring foot size instead of last size—and, commonly, Hong Kong. The system is sometimes described as Stich size (from Pariser Stich, the German name for the Paris point), or  size (from a German name of a micrometer for internal measurements).

Mondopoint 

The Mondopoint shoe length system is widely used in the sports industry to size athletic shoes, ski boots, skates, and pointe ballet shoes; it was also adopted as the primary shoe sizing system in the Soviet Union, Russia, East Germany, China, Japan, Taiwan, and South Korea, and as an optional system in the United Kingdom, India, Mexico, and European countries. The Mondopoint system is also used by NATO and other military services.

The Mondopoint system was introduced in the 1970s by International Standard ISO 2816:1973 "Fundamental characteristics of a system of shoe sizing to be known as Mondopoint" and ISO 3355:1975 "Shoe sizes – System of length grading (for use in the Mondopoint system)". ISO 9407:2019, "Shoe sizes—Mondopoint system of sizing and marking", is the current version of the standard.

The Mondopoint system is based on average foot length and foot width for which the shoe is suitable, measured in millimetres. The length of the foot is measured as horizontal distance between the perpendiculars in contact with the end of the most prominent toe and the most prominent part of the heel. The width of the foot is measured as horizontal distance between vertical lines in contact with the first and fifth metatarsophalangeal joints. The perimeter of the foot is the length of the foot circumference, measured with a flexible tape at the same points as foot width. The origin of the grade is zero.

Other customary markings, such as EU, UK and US sizes, may also be used.

Because Mondopoint takes the foot width into account, it allows for better fitting than most other systems. A given shoe size shall fit every foot with indicated average measurements, and those differing by no more than a half-step of the corresponding interval grid. Standard foot lengths are defined with interval steps of 5 mm for casual footwear and steps of 7.5 mm for specialty (protective) footwear. The standard is maintained by ISO Technical Committee 137 "Footwear sizing designations and marking systems."

East Asia 
In Japan, mainland China, Taiwan, and South Korea, the Mondopoint system is used as defined by national standard Japanese Industrial Standards (JIS) S 5037:1998 and its counterparts Guobiao (GB/T) 3293.1-1998, Chinese National Standard (CNS) 4800-S1093:2000 and Korean Standards Association (KS) M 6681:2007.

Foot length and girth (foot circumference) are taken into account. The foot length is indicated in centimetres; an increment of 5 mm is used.

The length is followed by designators for girth (A, B, C, D, E, EE, EEE, EEEE, F, G), which are specified in an indexed table as foot circumference in millimetres for each given foot length; foot width is also included as supplemental information. There are different tables for men's, women's, and children's (less than 12 years of age) shoes. Not all designators are used for all genders and in all countries. For example, the largest girth for women in Taiwan is EEEE, whereas in Japan, it is F.

The foot length and width can also be indicated in millimetres, separated by a slash or a hyphen.

Soviet Union (Russia, Commonwealth of Independent States) 
Historically the Soviet Union used the European (Paris point) system, but the Mondopoint metric system was introduced in the 1980s by GOST 24382-80 "Sizes of Sport Shoes" (based on ISO 2816:1973) and GOST 11373-88 "Shoe Sizes" (based on ISO 3355:1975), and lately by GOST R 58149-2018 (based on ISO 9407:1991)

Standard metric foot sizes can be converted to the nearest Paris point ( cm) sizes using approximate conversion tables; shoes are marked with both foot length in millimetres, as for pointe ballet shoe sizes, and last length in European Paris point sizes (although such converted Stichmaß sizes may come  to 1 size smaller than comparable European-made adult footwear, and up to  sizes smaller for children's footwear, according to ISO 19407 shoe size definitions). Foot lengths are aligned to 5 mm intervals for sports and casual shoes, and 7.5 mm for protective/safety shoes. Optional foot width designations includes narrow, normal (medium or regular), and wide grades.

Infant sizes start at 16 (95 mm) and pre-school kids at 23 (140 mm); schoolchildren sizes span 32 (202.5 mm) to 40 (255 mm) for girls and 32 to 44 (285 mm) for boys. Adult sizes span 33 (210 mm) to 44 for women and 38 (245 mm) to 48 (310 mm) for men.

ISO 19407 and shoe size conversion 
ISO/TS 19407:2015 Footwear - Sizing - Conversion of sizing systems is a technical specification from the International Organization for Standardization. It contains basic description and conversion tables for major shoe sizing systems including Mondopoint with length steps of 5 mm and 7.5 mm, European Paris point system, and UK -inch system. The standard has also been adopted as Russian GOST R 57425-2017.

The standard is maintained by ISO/TC 137, which also developed ISO/TS 19408:2015 Footwear - Sizing - Vocabulary and terminology; in development are companion standards  ISO/TS 19409 "Footwear - Sizing - Measurement of last dimensions" and ISO/TS 19410 "Footwear - Sizing - Inshoe measurement".

Shoe sizing
The adult shoe sizes are calculated from typical last length, which is converted from foot length in millimetres by adding an allowance of two shoe sizes:

where L is foot length in millimetres.

Direct conversion between adult UK, Continental European and Mondopoint shoe size systems is derived as follows:

Using these formulas, the standard derives shoe size tables for adults and children, based on actual foot length measurement (insole) in millimetres. Typical last length ranges are also included (13 to 25 mm over foot length for adults, 8% greater than foot length plus 6 mm for children).

Exact foot lengths may contain repeating decimals because the formulas include division by 3; in practice, approximate interval steps of 6.67 mm and 8.47 mm are used, and sizes are rounded to either the nearest half size or closest matching Mondopoint size.

Size marking 
It is recommended to include size marking in each of the four sizing systems on the shoe label and on the package. The principal system used for manufacturing the shoe needs to be placed first and emphasized with a boldface.

The standard includes quick conversion tables for adult shoe size marking; they provide matching sizes for shoes marked in Mondopoint, European, and UK systems. Converted values are rounded to a larger shoe size to increase comfort.

See also

 Clothing sizes
 List of shoe styles
 Shoes

References

External links
 IS 8751-1 (1978): Footwear sizes in mondopoint system, Part 1: Fundamental characteristics
 IS 8751-2 (1978): Footwear sizes in mondopoint system, Part 2: Length grading
 Chart of US shoe widths by size 

Anthropometry
Footwear
Sizes in clothing